Back to the Innocence may refer to:

 Back to the Innocence (Jonathan Cain album)
 Back to the Innocence (Seven and the Sun album), 2002